Australia at the Summer Universiade has participated in all editions held since the fifth edition of 1967 Summer Universiade.

Medal count
Australia won 183 medals in 24 appearances at the Summer Universiade and are at the 18th rank in the all-time Summer Universiade medal table.

See also 
Australia at the Olympics
Australia at the Paralympics
Australia at the Commonwealth Games

References

External links
 FISU History at the FISU

 
Nations at the Universiade
Student sport in Australia